Preston Powell (September 23, 1936 – August 23, 2020) was an American football fullback. He played for the Cleveland Browns in 1961.

He died on August 23, 2020, in Cleveland, Ohio at age 83.

References

1936 births
2020 deaths
American football fullbacks
Grambling State Tigers football players
Cleveland Browns players